Wierzchuca Nadbużna  is a village in the administrative district of Gmina Drohiczyn, within Siemiatycze County, Podlaskie Voivodeship, in north-eastern Poland. It has no commercial establishments and consists of a few houses along the east side of the Bug River.

References

Villages in Siemiatycze County